Giuseppe Sposetti (born 2 August 1933) is an Italian politician who served as a Deputy (1976–1983) and Mayor of Macerata for three terms (1967–1970, 1970–1975, 1980–1981).

References

1933 births
Mayors of Macerata
Deputies of Legislature VII of Italy
Deputies of Legislature VIII of Italy
Living people